Tetragonoderus elegans is a species of beetle in the family Carabidae. It was described by Andrewes in 1931.

References

elegans
Beetles described in 1931